Ghost Story is a 1974 British mystery film directed by Stephen Weeks and starring Marianne Faithfull, Leigh Lawson, Larry Dann and Anthony Bate. Although set in England, the film was almost entirely shot on location in India, much of it at Bangalore Palace, owned by the Maharajah of Mysore. The film features a rare performance from actor Vivian MacKerrell, who was later the inspiration for Withnail in Bruce Robinson's Withnail and I. The story and screenplay are by Philip Norman, Rosemary Sutcliff and Stephen Weeks and music is composed
by Ron Geesin. In a 2017 interview for "The Bill Podcast", actor Larry Dann revealed he has never been paid for his work on the film.

Plot
During the 1930s, three privileged old University friends gather for the week-end in an old country house located in a sprawling British estate. In fact, McFayden (Murray Melvin), the estate's owner, which he has recently inherited, invites his two college acquaintances Talbot (Larry Dann) and Duller (Vivian MacKerrell) ostensibly for a week-end of game hunting. Duller is sullen and rude, though an excellent shot while Talbot is easygoing but puzzled as to why he was asked along, especially when his colleagues continually abuse and ridicule him. As soon as they arrive, personality clashes, petty arguments and gloomy environment start on wear on everyone's nerves. To make matters worse, McFayden neglects to mention that the place might be haunted. During the night, Talbot begins to have strange hallucinations involving a creepy porcelain doll and the former occupants of the mansion.

Talbot finds himself transported back into time, bearing witness to the trials and tribulations of a young woman Sophy (Marianne Faithfull), who once resided in the house. As the story progresses, the tenuous ties that bind the men together begin to unravel and the strange visions begin to become more and more vivid until they threaten to drive one of them, Talbot mad. It turns out to be haunted by the previous occupants, though only Talbot can see them. Finally, McFayden admits that he invited Talbot and Duller because he had heard rumours that the house was haunted and he chose them both as likely subjects to draw any spirits out in the open. As the visions become more frequent and detailed, Talbot is thrust into a strange supernatural realm of incest, arson and madness from which escape is impossible.

Cast
 Anthony Bate - Dr. Borden 
 Larry Dann - Talbot
 Marianne Faithfull - Sophy Kwykwer
 Sally Grace - Girl 
 Penelope Keith - Rennie 
 Leigh Lawson - Robert 
 Vivian MacKerrell - Duller
 Murray Melvin - McFayden
 Barbara Shelley - Matron

References

External links

1974 films
British mystery films
Films set in country houses
Films set in Bangalore
1970s English-language films
Films directed by Stephen Weeks
1970s British films